As of October 4, 2018.

Highways (Motorways & Trunk Roads) : 100 km/h / 80 km/h 
By-Ways/Main Roads  : 50 km/h / 65 km/h
Approaching Roundabouts : 40 km/h
Residential Areas : 30 km/h

References

Trinidad and Tobago